John Sampson may refer to:

John Sampson (13th century), Constable of Stirling Castle
John Sampson (linguist) (1862–1931), Irish linguist
John Sampson (musician) (born 1955), Scottish musician
John A. Sampson (1873–1946), American gynecologist and medical researcher
John H. Sampson, professor of surgery, biomedical engineering, immunology, and pathology
John J. Sampson, American lawyer and professor
John L. Sampson (born 1965), New York state senator
John Patterson Sampson (1837–1928), American abolitionist, newspaper publisher, and minister
John Sampson (character), fictional character in James Patterson's Alex Cross novel series
John Sampson (North Carolina politician) (1719–1784), American Revolutionary military officer, government official, and politician
John Sampson (footballer) (1908–2001), Australian rules footballer